CHZ may refer to:
CHZ, IATA code for Chiloquin State Airport in Klamath County, Oregon, US
Circumstellar habitable zone, the range of orbits around a star where a planet with liquid water is possible
Centipede Hz (2012), album by Animal Collective
Čiernohronská železnica (Čierny Hron Railway), a heritage railroad in Slovakia